Television in Kazakhstan was first introduced in 1958. There are 116 private channels and 4 national commercial television.

Qazaqstan is the State Television Channel of Kazakhstan. Other country-wide television stations are Khabar and Yel Arna.

Gakku TV and Toi Duman are music channels dedicated solely to only airing music produced in Kazakhstan.

In December 2021, Kazakh Information and Social Protection Minister Aida Balayeva announced that the film industry in Kazakhstan produced over 250 TV series from 2016-2021.

Public channels

Qazaqstan - public broadcaster
KTK - commercial
NTK-TV - commercial
Stan TV - commercial

Private channels

NTV Plus - news
Digital-TV - news
Orbita Telecom - other
JSC Alma-TV - other
JSC ICON - other
JSC Digital-TV - other
IDNet - other
Astana TV - other
Balapan (channel) - children
Channel 31 (Kazakhstan)
Channel One Eurasia - other
Gakku TV - music, entertainment news
HiT TV - music
Kanal 7 - information
Kazakh TV - information
Khabar - news
Khabar 24 - news
KZ Sport 1 - sport
Qazsport - sport

Most viewed channels

References